The 1966–67 season is the 87th season of competitive football by Rangers.

Overview
Rangers played a total of 55 competitive matches during the 1966–67 season. The team suffered an infamous cup upset, when they lost 1–0 to Berwick Rangers in the first round of the 1966–67 Scottish Cup.

Results
All results are written with Rangers' score first.

Scottish First Division

Cup Winners' Cup

Scottish Cup

League Cup

Appearances

See also
 1966–67 in Scottish football
 1966–67 Scottish Cup
 1966–67 Scottish League Cup
 1966–67 European Cup Winners' Cup

References 

Rangers F.C. seasons
Rangers